Patrick Egan may refer to:
Patrick Egan (Catholic priest) (1923–2016), Redemptorist priest in charge of Men's Confraternity at Clonard Monastery, Belfast, during outbreak of the Troubles in Northern Ireland.
Patrick Egan (activist) (1841–1919), Irish Fenian, Land Leaguer, and later US ambassador to Chile
Pat Egan (1918–2008), Canadian ice hockey player
Patrick Egan (Irish politician) (died 1960), Irish Cumann na nGaedhael politician